Labadee is a port located on the northern coast of Haiti within the arrondissement of Cap-Haïtien in the Nord department. It is a private resort leased to Royal Caribbean Group, for the exclusive use of passengers of its three cruise lines: Royal Caribbean International, Celebrity Cruises, and Azamara Club Cruises, until 2050. Royal Caribbean has contributed the largest proportion of tourist revenue to Haiti since 1986, employing 300 locals, allowing another 200 to sell their wares on the premises for a fee  and paying the Haitian government US$12 per tourist. 
The resort is completely tourist-oriented, and is guarded by a private security force. The site is fenced off from the surrounding area, and passengers are not allowed to leave the property. Food available to tourists is brought from the cruise ships. A controlled group of Haitian merchants are given sole rights to sell their merchandise and establish their businesses in the resort. Although sometimes described as an island in advertisements, it is actually a peninsula contiguous with the island of Hispaniola. The cruise ship moors to the pier at Labadee capable of servicing the Oasis class ships, which was completed in late 2009. The commercial airport that is closest to Labadee is Cap-Haïtien International Airport.

Attractions include a Haitian flea market, beaches, watersports, a water-oriented playground, an alpine coaster, and the largest zip-line over water.

Etymology 
The location is named after the Marquis de La Badie, a Frenchman who first settled the area in the 17th century. The peninsula and a village were named Labadie. The cruise company spells the name "Labadee" to make it easier for American English-speakers to pronounce.

History 

In the 1990s it was variously reported that many cruise ship guests who disembarked at the location were apparently unaware that they were in Haiti - at least in part due to the fact that the cruise company seemed to have a policy of referring only to Hispaniola, not that they were in Haiti.

In November 2001, a crew member from the cruise line Royal Caribbean was attacked on Labadee in an apparent robbery. The assailants were arrested by Haitian police.

In February 2004, during the 2004 Haitian coup d'état, Royal Caribbean temporarily suspended use of the stop due to the political unrest in the country.

In 2009, Royal Caribbean made US$55 million improvements to the facilities, including upgrading port facilities to allow docking of their largest cruise ships.

In January 2010, just after the 2010 Haiti earthquake, Royal Caribbean announced its intention to continue cruise stopovers at the port and use cruise ships to ferry relief supplies and personnel. In addition, it would donate US$1 million to fund relief efforts in Haiti.

In January 2016, Haitians in boats protesting against the Haitian government blocked the port. Royal Caribbean's Freedom of the Seas cancelled their port stop on January 19 as a result.

References

External links 

 Labadee at the Royal Caribbean website
 

Bays of Haiti
Beaches of Haiti
Geography of Haiti
Populated places in Nord (Haitian department)
Royal Caribbean International